This is a bibliography of works on the Jehovah's Witnesses.

General

 
 

 Holden, Andrew. Jehovah's Witnesses: Portrait of a Contemporary Religious Movement New York: Routledge, 2002,

Critiques and personal accounts
 

Denscher, Ted (1974). An Alarming Situation for Jehovah's Witnesses, Christian Literature Crusade.
 
Franz, Raymond. Crisis of Conscience. Commentary Press. 420 pages. Hardback . Paperback . 4th edition (June 2002)
 Originally published in 1991. .
 

Hewitt, Joe (1997). I Was Raised a Jehovah's Witness. Kregel Publications 
Jonsson, Carl O. (1998, 2004).The Gentile Times Reconsidered: Chronology & Christ's Return. Commentary Press  
King, Robert (2005). Jehovah Himself Has Become King. AuthorHouse (First Edition) 
Kostelniuk, James (2001). Wolves Among Sheep: The True Story of Murder in a Jehovah’s Witness Community. HarperCollins Publishers Canada. 

 
 Schnell, William J. Jehovah's Witnesses' Errors Exposed. Grand Rapids, Mich.: Baker Book House, [ca. 1980], cop. 1959. N.B.: First published in 1959 under title: Into the Light of Christianity. 
 Schnell, William J.  30 Years a Watchtower Slave. Grand Rapids, Michigan:  Baker Books, 1956, 1971, reprinted 2001.  
 
Jehovah's Witnesses Defended and Three Dissertations, both by Greg Stafford.

Persecution in Nazi Germany

Garbe, Detlef (2008). Between Resistance and Martyrdom: Jehovah's Witnesses in the Third Reich. Madison, Wisconsin: University of Wisconsin Press. .
 
King, Christine Elizabeth (1983), The Nazi State and the New Religions: Five Case Studies in Non-Conformity. 
Penton, James (2004). Jehovah's Witnesses and the Third Reich: Sectarian Politics Under Persecution. Toronto: University of Toronto Press. .

Fiction

See also
List of Watch Tower Society publications

External links 
 Annotated resources for Jehovah's Witness for students of THEO 305: Theologies of Justice, Peace, Prosperity, and Security at the University of Saint Thomas

References

Jehovah's Witnesses